Kinetic fractionation is an isotopic fractionation process that separates stable isotopes from each other by their mass during unidirectional processes. Biological processes are generally unidirectional and are very good examples of "kinetic" isotope reactions. All organisms preferentially use lighter isotopic species, because "energy costs" are lower, resulting in a significant fractionation between the substrate (heavier) and the biologically mediated product (lighter). As an example, photosynthesis preferentially takes up the light isotope of carbon 12C during assimilation of an atmospheric CO2 molecule.  This kinetic isotope fractionation explains why plant material (and thus fossil fuels, which are derived from plants) is typically depleted in 13C by 25 per mil (2.5 per cent) relative to most inorganic carbon on Earth.

A naturally occurring example of non-biological kinetic fractionation occurs during the evaporation of seawater to form clouds under conditions in which some part of the transport is unidirectional, such as evaporation into very dry air. In this instance, isotopically lighter water molecules (i.e., those with 16O) will evaporate slightly more easily than will the isotopically heavier water molecules with 18O, and this difference will be greater than it would be if the evaporation was taking place under equilibrium conditions (with bidirectional transport).

During this process the oxygen isotopes are fractionated: the clouds become enriched with 16O, and the seawater becomes enriched in 18O. Whereas equilibrium fractionation makes the vapor about 10 per mil (1%) depleted in 18O relative to the liquid water, kinetic fractionation enhances this fractionation and often makes vapor that is about 15 per mil (1.5%) depleted. Condensation occurs almost exclusively by equilibrium processes, and so it enriches cloud droplets somewhat less than evaporation depletes the vapor.  This explains part of the reason why rainwater is observed to be isotopically lighter than seawater. 

The isotope of hydrogen in water, deuterium, is much less sensitive to kinetic fractionation than oxygen isotopes, relative to the very large equilibrium fractionation of deuterium.  For this reason kinetic fractionation does not deplete deuterium nearly as much, in a relative sense, as 18O. This gives rise to an excess of deuterium in vapor and rainfall, relative to seawater.  The value of this "deuterium excess", as it is called, is about +10 per mil (1%) in most meteoric waters and its non-zero value is a direct manifestation of kinetic isotope fractionation.

A generalized treatment of kinetic isotopic effects is via the GEBIK and GEBIF equations describing transient kinetic isotope effects.

Other types of fractionation 
 Equilibrium fractionation
 Mass-independent fractionation
 Transient kinetic isotope fractionation

See also
 Isotopic enrichment
 Isotopic ratio
 Kinetic isotope effect

References 

Fractionation
Environmental isotopes